Alberton railway station may refer to:

Alberton railway station, Adelaide
Alberton railway station, Victoria